Raivo Seppo (born 29 January 1973) is an Estonian novelist. He is a member of the Estonian Genealogical Society (.

His novels Pöörane Villemiine (2003) and Fredegunde, Neustria kuninganna (2006) received considerable acclaim by critics in Estonia.

Works
 Eesti nimeraamat; Olion 1994 Tallinn;  
 Hüatsintsõrmus; Kupar 1995; 
 Ahvatluste oaas; Eesti Raamat 2002; 
 Nimed ja nimepäevad; Olion 2002; 
 Pöörane Villemiine; Lambri raamat 2003; 
 Fredegunde, Neustria kuninganna; Eesti Raamat 2006; 
 Elavad nimed; Eesti Raamat 2008;

References
 Jüri Aarma, "Meie nimepäevakalendri imed", Maaleht
 Helen Urbanik, "Verise kuninganna järeltulija", Eesti Ekspress
 Inna Grünfeldt, "Kaemus: Kuupaistet ei saa kodustada", Virumaa Teataja
 Jan Kaus, "Pöörane kirjandus", Eesti Päevaleht
 "Igas riigis ise päeval", Maaleht
 Inna Grünfeldt, "Ahvatluste ja kire mängud", Virumaa Teataja 
 Meelis A. Piller, "Salapärane riigiametnik", Eesti Ekspress

Estonian male novelists
1973 births
Living people
20th-century Estonian novelists
21st-century Estonian novelists